The 2001 DFB-Pokal Final decided the winner of the 2000–01 DFB-Pokal, the 58th season of Germany's premier knockout football cup competition. It was played on 26 May 2001 at the Olympiastadion in Berlin. Schalke 04 won the match 2–0 against Union Berlin to claim their 3rd cup title.

Route to the final
The DFB-Pokal began with 64 teams in a single-elimination knockout cup competition. There were a total of five rounds leading up to the final. Teams were drawn against each other, and the winner after 90 minutes would advance. If still tied, 30 minutes of extra time was played. If the score was still level, a penalty shoot-out was used to determine the winner.

Note: In all results below, the score of the finalist is given first (H: home; A: away).

Match

Details

References

External links
 Match report at kicker.de 
 Match report at WorldFootball.net
 Match report at Fussballdaten.de 

1. FC Union Berlin matches
FC Schalke 04 matches
2000–01 in German football cups
2001
May 2001 sports events in Europe
2001 in Berlin
Football competitions in Berlin